The 1979–80 daytime network television schedule for the three major English-language commercial broadcast networks in the United States covers the weekday and weekend daytime hours from September 1979 to August 1980.

Legend

 New series are highlighted in bold.

Schedule
 All times correspond to U.S. Eastern and Pacific Time scheduling (except for some live sports or events). Except where affiliates slot certain programs outside their network-dictated timeslots, subtract one hour for Central, Mountain, Alaska, and Hawaii-Aleutian times.
 Local schedules may differ, as affiliates have the option to pre-empt or delay network programs. Such scheduling may be limited to preemptions caused by local or national breaking news or weather coverage (which may force stations to tape delay certain programs to other timeslots) and any major sports events scheduled to air in a weekday timeslot (mainly during major holidays). Stations may air shows at other times at their preference.

Monday–Friday

Notes:
 Programs aired before 9:00AM aired at the same time in all time zones. CBS's Sunrise Semester was a half-hour program which aired at either 6:00 or 6:30 AM, depending on the station.
 Programs scheduled after 10:00 AM Eastern aired one hour earlier (starting at 9:00 AM) in the Central and Pacific time zones. Stations in the Mountain time zone that started their network schedule at 8:00 AM would follow the Central and Pacific pattern that year.
 Some network programs, particularly before 7:00 AM and after 10:00/9:00 AM, were subject to preemption by local affiliate stations in favor of syndicated or locally produced programs.
 On ABC, World News Tonight was produced at 6:00 PM Eastern/5:00 PM Central, and aired live by some affiliates.  This early feed of the broadcast was discontinued in 1982.
 Love of Life ended its run on the air on CBS on February 1, 1980. It was replaced by reruns of CBS comedy reruns, such as One Day at a Time.
 A CBS News Razzmatazz special would occasionally preempt CBS' 4:00PM show.
 FYI aired on ABC at 12:58PM, 2:58PM, and 3:58PM starting January 14.

Saturday

In the News aired ten times during CBS' Saturday morning shows.

On NBC, Ask NBC News aired after Casper and the Angels, Super Globetrotters, and The New Adventures of Flash Gordon, and Time Out aired after Fred and Barney Meet the Thing, The New Shmoo and Godzilla.
By the end of the season, Ask NBC News aired after The Godzilla/Globetrotters Adventure Hour, Fred and Barney Meet the Shmoo, and The Daffy Duck Show, and Time Out aired after The Jetsons and Jonny Quest.

Sunday

By network

ABC

Returning Series
The $20,000 Pyramid
ABC Weekend Special
ABC World News Tonight
All My Children
American Bandstand
Animals, Animals, Animals
Captain Caveman and the Teen Angels
The Edge of Night
Family Feud
General Hospital
Good Morning America
Issues and Answers
Kids Are People Too
Laff-A-Lympics 
Laverne & Shirley 
The New Pink Panther Show
One Life to Live
Ryan's Hope
Schoolhouse Rock!

New Series
The Love Boat 
The Plastic Man Comedy/Adventure Show
Scooby-Doo and Scrappy-Doo
Spider-Woman
The World's Greatest Super Friends

Not Returning From 1978-79
Bigfoot and Wildboy
Challenge of the Super Friends
Fangface
Happy Days 
Scooby's All Stars 
Scooby-Doo, Where Are You!

CBS

Returning Series
30 Minutes
The All New Popeye Hour
As the World Turns
The Bugs Bunny/Road Runner Hour
Captain Kangaroo
CBS Children's Film Festival
CBS Evening News
CBS News Sunday Morning
Face the Nation
The New Fat Albert Show
Guiding Light
Jason of Star Command
Love of Life
Morning
The Price Is Right
The Robonic Stooges 
Search for Tomorrow
Shazam! 
The Skatebirds 
Sunrise Semester
Tarzan and the Super 7
Tarzan, Lord of the Jungle
Whew!
The Young and the Restless

New Series
Alice 
Beat the Clock
The Jeffersons 
The New Adventures of Mighty Mouse and Heckle & Jeckle
One Day at a Time 

Not Returning From 1978-79
All in the Family 
Ark II 
Camera Three
Clue Club 
Lamp Unto My Feet
Look Up and Live
M*A*S*H 
Match Game 
Space Academy 
Tattletales
What's New, Mr. Magoo?

NBC

Returning Series
Another World
The Daffy Duck Show
Days of Our Lives
The Doctors
Card Sharks
Godzilla
High Rollers
The Hollywood Squares
The Jetsons 
Jonny Quest 
Meet the Press
NBC Nightly News
Mindreaders
Password Plus
Today
Wheel of Fortune

New Series
Casper and the Angels
Chain Reaction
The David Letterman Show
Fred and Barney Meet the Shmoo
Fred and Barney Meet the Thing
Hot Hero Sandwich
The New Adventures of Flash Gordon
The New Shmoo
The Super Globetrotters
Texas

Not Returning From 1978-79
All Star Secrets
The Alvin Show 
America Alive!
Baggy Pants and the Nitwits 
Buford and the Galloping Ghost
Fabulous Funnies
The New Fantastic Four
Galaxy Goof-Ups
Jana of the Jungle
Jeopardy! 
The Krofft Superstar Hour
The New Fred and Barney Show
The Metric Marvels
Yogi's Space Race

See also
1979-80 United States network television schedule (prime-time)
1979-80 United States network television schedule (late night)

Sources
https://web.archive.org/web/20071015122215/http://curtalliaume.com/abc_day.html
https://web.archive.org/web/20071015122235/http://curtalliaume.com/cbs_day.html
https://web.archive.org/web/20071012211242/http://curtalliaume.com/nbc_day.html

United States weekday network television schedules
1979 in American television
1980 in American television